Allocution may refer to:

 Allocution, in criminal procedure, a statement by the defendant before sentencing
 Papal allocution, a decision by the Pope
 Allocution (media theory), a form of communication